The Dawn of Battle is a three song EP released in 2002 on the Nuclear Blast label by heavy metal band Manowar.

This peculiar disc is a CD on one side and a DVD on the other side; the outer (unused) region of each side is painted black like a regular CD or DVD back side.

The EP also contains some video material from Ringfest, a promotional trailer for the Fire and Blood DVD, and a link to a special website.

To promote the EP, a promotional music video was made for the song "I Believe".

"The Dawn of Battle" was featured in the 2009 video game Brütal Legend.

Track listing

2003 EPs
Manowar albums
Albums with cover art by Ken Kelly (artist)
Nuclear Blast EPs